Jermaine "Tuffy" Anderson (born 22, February 1979 in Falmouth) is a Jamaican footballer and coach who plays for Waterhouse.

Honours 

Waterhouse FC

 JFF Champions Cup: 2013

References

External links
 

1979 births
Living people
Jamaican footballers
Jamaica international footballers
Village United F.C. players
Montego Bay United F.C. players
Wadadah F.C. players
Waterhouse F.C. players
C.D. Águila footballers
National Premier League players

Association football forwards